The Presidente Plutarco Elías Calles Dam or Plutarco Elías Calles Dam, is a dam located in the municipality of San José de Gracia (Aguascalientes), Mexico,  west of the Pan-American Highway (Federal #45) in the north of the state on the edge of the Sierra Fría.

Its use is mainly agricultural, with 2,000 users over 4,000 ha.

History 
Its spillway was built between 1927 and 1928 by the American company JG White.

It was the first irrigation project of the Mexican Revolution regime. It dates back to the end of the 19th century, formulated by the engineer Blas Romo, named Santiago Dam Project. The project remained dormant until November 1925. On a visit to the state of Aguascalientes by then President Plutarco Elías Calles, the dam project was presented to him. It was then approved.

The project was then titled Irrigation System No. 1.

An image of the El Cristo Roto Monument was placed inside the dam on an island (former Mountain). Another dam with the same name sits in the state of Sonora, also known as El Novillo. It was built long after the Aguascalientes dam.

Gallery

References

External links 

 Herencia pabellonense

Dams in Mexico
Buildings and structures in Aguascalientes
1928 architecture
Geography of Aguascalientes
1928 establishments in Mexico
1928 in Mexico